The 1942 Great Lakes Navy Bluejackets football team represented the United States Navy's Great Lakes Naval Training Station (Great Lakes NTS) during the 1942 college football season. Playing a schedule that included six Big Nine Conference football teams, Notre Dame, Pitt, Michigan State, and Missouri, the team compiled an 8–3–1 record, shut out seven opponents, and outscored all opponents by a total of 222 to 55. The team was ranked No. 1 among the service teams in a poll of 91 sports writers conducted by the Associated Press.

The team's head coach was Tony Hinkle, who coached football, baseball, and basketball at Butler University before the war. Butler agreed in March 1942 to send Hinkle to Great Lakes NTS to assist in the war effort.

The team was made up of college and professional football players who were serving in the Navy and stationed at Great Lakes NTS.  The team was led on offense by Bruce Smith, who won the Heisman Trophy in 1941 while playing for Minnesota. Other players included: Rudy Mucha, a consensus All-American center in 1940 who spent the 1941 season in the NFL, Bob Sweiger (fullback, Minnesota), Pete Kmetovic (halfback, Stanford), Vic Marino (All-Big Ten guard from Ohio State) Bill Radovich (guard, USC/Detroit Lions), Carl Mulleneaux (end, Utah State), and Steve Belichick, father of Bill Belichick who played for the Detroit Lions in 1941.

Schedule

References

Great Lakes Navy
Great Lakes Navy Bluejackets football seasons
Great Lakes Navy Bluejackets football